This is a list of last surviving veterans of World War II (1939–1945) among various groups of veterans, as identified by reliable sources. About 70 million people fought in World War II and, there are still approximately 167,000 surviving veterans in the United States alone. Only people who are (or were) the last surviving member of a notable group of veterans are listed.

Last survivors

See also
List of last surviving veterans of military insurgencies and wars

Notes

References

Military personnel of World War II
People of World War II
Surviving
World War II